Curacaví Airport ,  is an airport serving Curacaví, a city in the Santiago Metropolitan Region of Chile.

There is mountainous terrain in all quadrants.

See also

Transport in Chile
List of airports in Chile

References

External links
OpenStreetMap - Curacaví
OurAirports - Curacaví
SkyVector - Curacaví
FallingRain - Curacaví Airport

Airports in Santiago Metropolitan Region